Letestua is a monotypic genus of plants in the family Sapotaceae, described as a genus in 1917.

The genus name of Letestua is in honour of Georges Marie Patrice Charles Le Testu (1877–1967), who was a French colonial administrator in tropical Africa and later worked at a botanical garden in Caen.

There is only one recognized species, Letestua durissima. It is native to Gabon and West Congo.

References

Sapotoideae
Flora of Africa
Monotypic Ericales genera
Taxa named by Auguste Chevalier
Sapotaceae genera